Charles Fleming may refer to:

Charles Fleming (ornithologist) (1916–1987), New Zealand ornithologist, avian palaeontologist and environmentalist
Charles Fleming (cricketer) (1887–1918), English cricketer
Charles E. Fleming (born 1962), Judge of the United States District Court for the Northern District of Ohio
Charles James Fleming (1839–1904), British Member of Parliament for Doncaster, 1892–1895
Charlie Fleming (1927–1997), Scottish footballer
Charles Fleming (author), American author
Charles Fleming (American football) (1877–1944), American football quarterback
Charles Fleming (rugby union) (1868–1948), Scotland international rugby union player

See also
Charles Elphinstone Fleeming (1774–1840), Royal Navy officer